HMS Azalea was a  that served in the Royal Navy during World War II.

Construction
Azalea was laid down by Cook, Welton & Gemmell of Beverley on 15 November 1939; launched on 8 July 1940; and commissioned on 27 January 1941.

World War II service
On 12 April 1941, Azalea and  fired a shot over the bow of the U.S.-flagged American Export liner   out of Lisbon. After crew aboard Azalea questioned Wenzel Habel, the captain of the unarmed passenger liner, Siboney was allowed to go on her way.

HMS Azalea was the sole allied warship present during the German raid on allied landing craft during Exercise Tiger off Slapton Sands, England in the early morning of 28 April 1944. Although Azalea received word via radio of the presence of German torpedo boats from naval headquarters ashore, because of a typographical error in orders, the escorted LST's did not. Azalea did not relay the notice. In the attack, three LST's were hit by torpedoes, two were sunk.

Fate
Azalea was sold on 5 April 1946 and became the merchant ship Norte. She sank on 19 January 1955.

References

External links
 HMS Azalea on the Arnold Hague database at convoyweb.org.uk.

 

Flower-class corvettes of the Royal Navy
1940 ships